Snow Kingdom is India's largest snow theme park. It occupies  in Chennai, Tamil Nadu and Mumbai, Maharashtra. 

The park provides sterilised, cold weather clothing to allow visitors to cope with the sub-zero temperature inside. The snow is made by reverse osmosis of water. Inside the theme park, there are replicas of seals, penguins, and snow deer.

Other attractions include a Click Art Museum, which hosts 23 incomplete 3D art paintings that wait to become complete as visitors enter the frame, and a Live Art Museum, which consists of models of celebrities from around the world.

References

External links
 

Amusement parks in Tamil Nadu
Tourist attractions in Chennai
Tourist attractions in Mumbai
Year of establishment missing